Cercospora fusca is a fungal plant pathogen.

References

External links

fusca
Fungal plant pathogens and diseases